The North Carolina General Assembly of 2001–2002 met during 2001 and 2002 in the State capital of Raleigh, North Carolina.  Members of the 2001–2002 House and Senate were elected on November 7, 2000. This session of the General Assembly was the last in which some house and senate districts elected multiple representatives to the state legislature.

House
The house leadership was as follows:

House leadership

House members
There were 62 Democrats and 58 Republicans in the House.  Members represented 98 Districts and included 28 women, 18 African-Americans, one Native-American, and one Hispanic-American. Members are listed below with their District, party affiliation, home town, and counties they represented:

State Senate

Leaders

The Senate leadership included the following:

Members
There were 50 senators, including 35 Democrats, 15 Republicans, 45 men, five women, and seven African Americans. There were 42 districts, and some districts had two senators (12, 13, 14, 16, 17, 20, 27, and 28).  The Senate members included the following:

↑: Member was first appointed to office.

References

2001-2002
General Assembly
General Assembly
 2001
 2001
2001 U.S. legislative sessions
2002 U.S. legislative sessions